Wang Yuanlu (c. 1849 – 1931) was a Taoist priest and abbot of the Mogao Caves at Dunhuang during the early 20th century. He is credited with the discovery of the Dunhuang manuscripts and was engaged in the restoration of the site, which he funded with the sale of numerous manuscripts to Western and Japanese explorers.

Biography 
Wang Yuanlu was an itinerant monk, originally from Shanxi Province. He was active from the late 19th to the early 20th centuries.

He was a self-appointed caretaker of the Dunhuang cave complex and a self-styled Taoist priest. The cave complex contained 50,000 manuscripts detailing of medieval China, the Silk Roads, and Buddhism.

He died in 1931 at the Mogao Grottoes.

Involvement with Dunhuang manuscripts
When engaging in an amateur restoration of statues and paintings in what is now known as Cave 16, Wang noticed a hidden door which opened into another cave, later named Cave 17 or the "Library Cave". There, he found the yet-undiscovered cache of thousands of ancient manuscripts, many of which relate to early Chinese Buddhism.  
 
He first spoke of the manuscripts to the local officials in an attempt to gain funding for their conservation. The officials ordered the reseal the cave, in preparation of the transportation, preservation and study. He would also later sell numerous manuscripts to archaeologist Aurel Stein, who took a largely random selection of the works. Later, Paul Pelliot would come to purchase what may be considered the most valuable among them. Because of his involvement in the discovery and sale of the Dunhuang manuscripts to Westerners for a fraction of their value (£220 in 1907), Wang is both "revered and reviled."

See also
International Dunhuang Project
Mawangdui

References

Sources 
 Heimovics, Dick (1999). Connecting and Disconnections on the Silk Road
 Hopkirk, Peter (1980). Foreign Devils on the Silk Road: The Search for the Lost Cities and Treasures of Chinese Central Asia. Amherst: The University of Massachusetts Press. .
 Mair, Victor H. (ed.) 2001. The Columbia History of Chinese Literature. New York: Columbia University Press. . (Amazon Kindle edition.)

External links 
 The Oldest Printed Text in the World - The Diamond Sutra
 The David Middleton Reed Collection of Chinese Studies

Qing dynasty Taoists
Republic of China Taoists
Archaeology of China
1931 deaths
People from Shanxi
Dunhuang
Year of birth uncertain